Volney Monroe Peters (January 1, 1928 – December 28, 2015) was an American football defensive tackle in the National Football League and the American Football League.

Early life
Peters graduated from Hoover High School in San Diego in 1947.

Career

College 
Peters went to Compton Community College and then was a two-way lineman for three years at the University of Southern California. As a senior, he was a first-team All-Pacific Coast Conference pick and was named to the 1951 East–West Shrine Game first-team and the 1951 College All Stars Hula Bowl first-team. Peters established a USC career record for minutes played.

Professional 
After a brief time in the Marine Corps, Peters played in the NFL from 1952 to 1958. He was drafted by the Chicago Cardinals and also played for the Washington Redskins and the Philadelphia Eagles. He retired briefly before then-Los Angeles Chargers coach Sid Gillman convinced him to make a comeback to play for the American Football League team. He finished his career with the Oakland Raiders.

Peters was named a 1956 NFL Pro Bowl pick, and was named to the Sporting News 1960 All-AFL team.

In 2006, Peters was inducted into the San Diego Hall of Champions Breitbard Hall of Fame.

Death
He died on December 28, 2015.

See also
 List of American Football League players

References

1928 births
2015 deaths
American Football League All-League players
American Football League All-Star players
American football defensive linemen
American football offensive linemen
Chicago Cardinals players
Eastern Conference Pro Bowl players
Los Angeles Chargers players
Oakland Raiders players
Players of American football from San Diego
Philadelphia Eagles players
USC Trojans football players
Washington Redskins players
American Football League players
United States Marines